The Peter Kemble House is a historic house built  and located on Mount Kemble Avenue (U.S. Route 202) at Old Camp Road in Harding Township in Morris County, New Jersey. It was documented by the Historic American Buildings Survey in 1937. It was added to the National Register of Historic Places on August 26, 1980, for its significance in commerce, military history, and politics/government. The Georgian style house was added as a contributing property of the Tempe Wick Road–Washington Corners Historic District on August 25, 2000.

History and description
The two and one-half story house was built  by Peter Kemble (1704–1789), who had moved here from New Brunswick after purchasing . In 1840, his son Richard Kemble sold the property to Harry S. Hoyt, who moved the house  to its new location slightly closer to Morristown. In 1885, he sold it to David Hunter McAlpin (1816–1901).

August 27–28, 1781, the First Brigade of the French Army, the Expédition Particulière, under command of the French general Comte de Rochambeau, marched past this house, along the route to Yorktown, Virginia.

See also
 National Register of Historic Places listings in Morris County, New Jersey
 List of the oldest buildings in New Jersey
 List of historic sites preserved along Rochambeau's route

References

External links
 
 

	
Harding Township, New Jersey
Houses in Morris County, New Jersey
Houses on the National Register of Historic Places in New Jersey
National Register of Historic Places in Morris County, New Jersey
1750 establishments in New Jersey
Georgian architecture in New Jersey
New Jersey Register of Historic Places
Historic American Buildings Survey in New Jersey
Individually listed contributing properties to historic districts on the National Register in New Jersey
Historic places on the Washington–Rochambeau Revolutionary Route